Justice Hansen may refer to:

Connor Hansen, associate justice of the Wisconsin Supreme Court
Elias Hansen (judge), associate justice and chief justice of the Utah Supreme Court
Robert W. Hansen, associate justice of the Wisconsin Supreme Court
Justice Hansen (American football), American football player

See also
Justice Hanson (disambiguation)